James Burton Loken (born May 21, 1940) is a United States circuit judge of the United States Court of Appeals for the Eighth Circuit since 1990.

Education and legal training
Loken earned his Bachelor of Science degree from the University of Wisconsin–Madison in 1962 and his Juris Doctor from Harvard Law School in 1965. After law school, he clerked for Judge J. Edward Lumbard of the United States Court of Appeals for the Second Circuit from 1965 to 1966 and for Associate Justice Byron White of the United States Supreme Court from 1966 to 1967.

Professional career
Loken was in private practice in Minneapolis, Minnesota from 1967 to 1970. He was General Counsel to the President's Committee on Consumer Interests in 1970 and a staff assistant to President Richard M. Nixon from 1970 to 1972. Loken returned to private practice in Minneapolis from 1973 to 1990 with the white shoe law firm of Faegre & Benson.

Federal judicial service
Loken was nominated to the United States Court of Appeals for the Eighth Circuit by President George H. W. Bush on September 10, 1990, to a seat vacated by Judge Gerald William Heaney. He was confirmed by the United States Senate on October 12, 1990, and received his commission on October 17, 1990. Future Dean of Brooklyn Law School Michael T. Cahill served as his law clerk from 1999-2000.

He served as chief judge of the court from April 1, 2003 through March 31, 2010, when he was succeeded as chief judge by William J. Riley. He is currently an active judge on the court. Loken is currently the oldest 8th circuit judge that still occupies their seat (meaning not in senior status), and has been so since December 14, 2018, when Roger Leland Wollman went senior.

Notable cases 

In July 2017, Loken wrote for the en banc Eighth Circuit when it found, by a vote of 7-2, that the National Labor Relations Act did not protect Jimmy John's employees from being fired for putting up Industrial Workers of the World posters seeking sick leave.

See also
List of law clerks of the Supreme Court of the United States (Seat 6)

References

External links
FJC Bio

1940 births
20th-century American judges
Harvard Law School alumni
Judges of the United States Court of Appeals for the Eighth Circuit
Law clerks of the Supreme Court of the United States
Living people
Lawyers from Madison, Wisconsin
United States court of appeals judges appointed by George H. W. Bush
University of Wisconsin–Madison alumni